Ahmed El-Sayed (born 12 July 1971) is an Egyptian judoka. He competed in the men's extra-lightweight event at the 1992 Summer Olympics.

References

External links
 

1971 births
Living people
Egyptian male judoka
Olympic judoka of Egypt
Judoka at the 1992 Summer Olympics
Place of birth missing (living people)
20th-century Egyptian people
21st-century Egyptian people
African Games medalists in judo
African Games gold medalists for Egypt
African Games bronze medalists for Egypt
Competitors at the 1991 All-Africa Games
Competitors at the 1995 All-Africa Games